Sir Charles Swift Lillicrap, KCB, MBE (12 November 1887 – 17 June 1966) was a British naval architect. A member of the Royal Corps of Naval Constructors, he was Director of Naval Construction from 1944 to 1951.

References 

 https://www.oxforddnb.com/display/10.1093/ref:odnb/9780198614128.001.0001/odnb-9780198614128-e-34532
 https://www.ukwhoswho.com/display/10.1093/ww/9780199540891.001.0001/ww-9780199540884-e-49128

External links 

 

1887 births
1966 deaths
Knights Commander of the Order of the Bath
British naval architects
Graduates of the Royal Naval College, Greenwich
Officiers of the Légion d'honneur
Grand Officers of the Order of Orange-Nassau